S3000 may refer to :
 Akai S3000XL, a 1996 16-bit professional stereo digital sampler
 EV-S3000, a Hi8 VCR
 FinePix S3000, a 2003 3.2 megapixel digital camera with a 6x optical zoom lens by Fujifilm